"Livin' for the Weekend" is a song by English singer Dina Carroll, from her second studio album, Only Human (1996). It was co-produced by Nigel Lowis and David Morales. The record was a dance club hit in the UK.

Critical reception
The single received mixed reviews in Europe. Jon O'Brien from AllMusic described it as "Black Box-esque". Portugal's Manchete commented that Carroll failed to distinguish herself from Mariah Carey even in "Livin' for the Weekend". Vikki Tobak for Vibe wrote that the song and "Mind Body & Soul" are "dance-floor sure shots that complement Dina's smooth, textured vocals."

Charts

References

1996 songs
Songs written by David Morales
Dina Carroll songs
Mercury Records singles
Songs written by Nigel Lowis
Songs written by Dina Carroll